Thomas Woodward (8 December 1917 – 18 November 1994) was an English footballer who played in the Football League for Bolton Wanderers and Middlesbrough.

In the season 1951-1952, he scored 3 goals in 22 appearances in the Lancashire Combination for Wigan Athletic.Woodward had scored 19 goals for Bolton in 169 cup games and leagues.

Career
Woodward made his first team debut against Stoke City in 1936 when he was 18 years old.

References

External links
 
 

English footballers
English Football League players
Bolton Wanderers F.C. players
Middlesbrough F.C. players
1917 births
1994 deaths
People from Westhoughton
Wigan Athletic F.C. players
Association football wingers